Edward Joseph McGah (September 30, 1921 – September 30, 2002) also known as E.J. McGah, was a reserve catcher in Major League Baseball who played with the Boston Red Sox for parts of the 1946 and 1947 seasons. He was born in Oakland, California, and after his baseball career he and his father (Edward J. and Edward W., respectively) were minority owners in the Oakland Raiders.

Path to the majors
McGah attended Roosevelt High School in Oakland, and after graduating was signed by a Red Sox scout. McGah first played in the Boston minor league system in 1940, with the Canton Terriers of the Class C Middle Atlantic League; his season was cut short by a knee injury.  In 1941 he began the season with the Oneonta Indians of the Class C Canadian–American League, then moved up to the Scranton Red Sox of the Class A Eastern League. He was still with Scranton in 1942, but again had his season cut short by knee problems.  Records for his early seasons are incomplete; the available records cover 125 games where he batted 147-for-458 (.321).

Later in 1942 he joined the US Navy, where he spent the next three years in military service during World War II – he was stationed, and excelled while playing baseball on military teams, in Oakland and Hawaii.

Boston Red Sox
McGah was the third-string catcher for Boston for much of the  season. He played sparingly, behind more experienced catchers Hal Wagner and Roy Partee.  Frankie Pytlak had also started the year catching with the team, but his last appearance was April 25, the day before McGah's first appearance. In 15 games played  – two in April, three in May, six in June, and four in September – McGah batted 8-for-37 (.216) with just 1 RBI.  The Red Sox went to the 1946 World Series, losing in seven games to the Cardinals, but McGah did not play in the postseason.

At the start of the  season, McGah was optioned to the Class AAA Louisville Colonels of the American Association.  He appeared in 59 games with the Colonels, batting .218 with 6 home runs and 16 RBI.  He did play in 9 games with Boston –1 game in both July and August, then 7 games in September – however was hitless in 14 at bats.

In parts of two seasons with Boston, he was a .157 hitter (8-for-51) with 3 runs scored and 3 RBI in 24 games. In 21 catching appearances, he committed 2 errors in 81 total chances for a .975 fielding percentage.

After the majors
In 1948, McGah – now playing third base – closed out his time in the Red Sox organization with 35 games for Scranton, hitting .248 and again experiencing knee problems.  After his baseball career, he and his father were part-owners of the Oakland Raiders – that ownership became the subject of a lawsuit, after McGah died in his hometown in 2002, on the day of his 81st birthday.  Some remaining members of his family run a pub, which carries the family name, in Danville, California.

See also

Oakland Raiders Ownership

References

External links

1921 births
2002 deaths
Baseball players from Oakland, California
Boston Red Sox players
Canton Terriers players
Louisville Colonels (minor league) players
Major League Baseball catchers
Oakland Raiders owners
Oneonta Indians players
Scranton Red Sox players